Xu Ai (1487–1517) was an important Chinese philosopher during the mid-late Ming Dynasty. He was also a magistrate and writer.

Biography

Xu was born in Maoyan (馬堰/马堰), Yuyao, Shaoxing Fu (紹興府/绍兴府; current Yuyao, Ningbo), Zhejiang Province in 1487. His courtesy name was Yueren (曰仁), and artist's pseudonym was Hengshan (横山).

In the third year of Zhengde Era (正德三年; 1508), Xu joined the imperial examination and was qualified and matriculated as a governmental official. He was the mayor of Qizhou (祁州; current Anguo, Hebei Province). Later he was transferred to Nanjing, the sub-capital of the Ming China. In Nanjing, he chronologically served in the Ministry of Military (兵部) as a Yuanwailang (員外郎/员外郎) and in Ministry of Construction (工部) as a Langzhong (郎中) there.

In the 11th year of Zhengde Era (1516), Xu went back to hometown for mothering; and in 1517 died of illness at the age of 31.

Philosophy

Xu was one of the earliest student of the philosopher Wang Yangming. He was considered as a royal, important member and the second generation of the Yangming School of Mind (陽明心學/阳明心学).

Wang Yangming proposed his thought of conscience and intuitive knowledge, but most people and Confucians during his time didn't accept it. Xu mainly contributed to the further expatiation and the consummation of Wang's philosophy in this domain, and also further developed Wang's school of philosophy.

Xu recorded most of Wang's words (from both his daily living and teaching) and works, collected and recensing them, also printed and published these philosophical monographies. So Xu also played an important role in publicizing the philosophy in a popular style.

References
 Historic records:
 History of Ming: Biography of Xu Ai
 The Record of Teaching and Practising (《傳習錄》/《传习录》): Dialogues between Xu Ai and Wang Yangming
 Academic Record of Ming Confucians (《明儒學案》/《明儒学案》; by Huang Zongxi): Biography of Xu Ai

Ming dynasty philosophers
16th-century Chinese philosophers
Chinese Confucianists
Neo-Confucian scholars
1487 births
1517 deaths
Writers from Ningbo
Philosophers from Zhejiang
Ming dynasty politicians
Politicians from Ningbo
People from Yuyao